John Motton (born June 20, 1967) is a former American and Canadian football linebacker and fullback in the Canadian Football League (CFL) and Arena Football League (AFL). He played for the Hamilton Tiger-Cats, Winnipeg Blue Bombers and Birmingham Barracudas of the CFL and the Iowa Barnstormers, Buffalo Destroyers of the AFL. Motton played college football at Akron.

References

1967 births
Living people
Players of American football from Columbus, Ohio
Players of Canadian football from Columbus, Ohio
American players of Canadian football
American football linebackers
American football fullbacks
Canadian football linebackers
Akron Zips football players
Hamilton Tiger-Cats players
Winnipeg Blue Bombers players
Birmingham Barracudas players
Iowa Barnstormers players
Buffalo Destroyers players
Columbus Destroyers players